Walter Lord (born 1 November 1933) was an English former professional footballer who played as an inside forward.

References

1933 births
Living people
Footballers from Grimsby
English footballers
Association football inside forwards
Grimsby Town F.C. players
Lincoln City F.C. players
Alford United F.C. players
English Football League players